Shelley Blond (born 25 March 1970) is an English actress, voice actress, television presenter, author, announcer and businesswoman.

Career
Shelley Blond was the first voice-actress for Lara Croft, lending her voice to the Croft character in the classic Tomb Raider game. The New York Times claimed her dulcet tones were "sexier than Kathleen Turner as Jessica Rabbit". She was also several character voices in the computer game Black & White.

Blond appeared in Cold Feet as character Geraldine Hughes; as Michelle, Jez's girlfriend, in Peep Show; and the television film Cruise of the Gods as PA Romy as well as in West End musicals Only The Lonely (Patsy Cline) and Elvis, both for Bill Kenwright.

Blond has hosted Room Raiders, T99, and Trouble at Breakfast for Trouble TV, Crazy Drivers for Bravo and It's a Mystery for CITV as well as having starred in over 15 high-profile television commercials, including Toffee Crisp Clusters, David Gray's White Ladder album, Pot Noodle, Lambrini, and Celebrity Big Brother idents for Comic Relief.

A successful voice over artiste, she is the voice of Spooky Sister Amelia on Disney Channel's The Spooky Sisters, Cinderella in Snow White: The Sequel and Audrey Glamour in the 2014 film Moomins on the Riviera. She is the long-standing regular voice for ITV, Discovery Channel, National Geographic Channel, History/Bio/Crime & Investigation channels, FX, Virgin Media On Demand, and is the voice for numerous cartoons, commercials, and jingles.

Also an author, her children's books, The Multi-Coloured Bird and The Lonely Spider are published by Five Dads Ltd.

Currently, Blond works as announcer and commanding as president at the agency, Yakety Yak.

Filmography

Film

Television

Video games

References

External links

Shelley Blond at Yakety Yak All Mouth Ltd

English children's writers
English film actresses
English musical theatre actresses
English television actresses
English television presenters
English voice actresses
English video game actresses
Living people
20th-century English actresses
21st-century English actresses
1970 births